Koiak 18 - Coptic Calendar - Koiak 20 

The nineteenth day of the Coptic month of Koiak, the fourth month of the Coptic year. On a common year, this day corresponds to December 15, of the Julian Calendar, and December 28, of the Gregorian Calendar. This day falls in the Coptic season of Peret, the season of emergence. This day falls in the Nativity Fast.

Commemorations

Saints 

 The departure of Pope Gabriel VI, the 91st Patriarch of the See of Saint Mark 
 The departure of Saint John the Hagiographer, Bishop of El-Borollos

References 

Days of the Coptic calendar